The Clark Conservatory of Music is a music school that was founded in 1979 in Detroit, Michigan by the late, Dr. Mattie Moss Clark It established itself as one of the most prestigious schools of its kind in the country. Now headed by her daughter Dorinda Clark-Cole.

References

Music schools in Michigan
Music of Detroit
Schools in Detroit